This article lists major incidents of the Toronto Transit Commission (TTC) since 1954, such as accidents and other notable unplanned events.

Accidents and other incidents

1900s
 On March 27, 1963, a six-car Gloucester-series subway train was completely destroyed by fire. This occurred on a spare track near Union station, after the few remaining passengers were evacuated.
 On November 7, 1975, 16-year-old schoolgirl Mariam Debra Peters was murdered in St. Patrick station. This led to sections of the respective platforms of St. Patrick and Queen's Park stations being sealed off from the public, along with the installation of "prison" bars at the south end of Museum station to allow for ventilation and storage. This part of Museum station is being replaced with a second exit since 2022.
 On December 12, 1975, a TTC bus travelling east on St. Clair Avenue collided with a westbound GO Transit train at the level crossing between Danforth Road and Midland Avenue just north of the Scarborough GO Train Station. Nine people were killed and 20 others injured. This was the worst accident in terms of loss of life in the history of both the TTC and GO Transit systems. The level crossing was replaced by an overpass a few years later. This also led to the Ontario-wide law that all public transit buses and school buses must come to a stop at level rail crossings prior to proceeding.
 On October 15, 1976, arson destroyed a train and caused significant damage to Christie station. Evidence remains today with the odd-coloured trim tiles on the top of the station walls on the centre of the platforms. A section of the line was closed for two days.
 On June 1, 1982, electrician Reynold Achong was killed by a train while working on the tracks at Summerhill station.
 On August 11, 1995, the Russell Hill subway accident resulted in the deaths of three passengers and injuries to 30 others. There were an additional 100 passengers who filed injury-related claims from the accident.
 In late 1995, TTC employee Jimmy Trajceski was killed during a robbery at Victoria Park station. Adrian Kinkead was arrested four months later for the crime and was found to be responsible for two other murders. He was convicted of all three crimes and sentenced to life in prison.
 On September 27, 1997, 23-year-old Charlene Minkowski was killed when she was pushed in front of a southbound train at Dundas station. Herbert Cheong, a diagnosed schizophrenic, was convicted of second-degree murder and sentenced to life in prison with no possibility of parole for 15 years.
 In January 1999, an exceptionally large snowstorm paralyzed parts of central Ontario and the American Midwest. Over a two-week period,  of snow fell, with  falling in a single day. As a result, the city and the transit system were severely impacted. In the following days, major interruptions and delays were incurred and TTC policies to handle snow were changed.

2000s

2000–2009
 On December 8, 2000, a garbage train caught fire while en route through Old Mill station. The train was completely destroyed and the station remained closed for two days. Since the incident, the TTC has stopped the practice of using garbage trains and maintains a fleet of surface garbage trucks to collect refuse.
 On August 14, 2003, the Northeast Blackout severely impacted TTC services. Without power, subway service was suspended and 18 trains were stuck in tunnels; however, all other trains were able to coast to the nearest station to be evacuated. Streetcars remained stationary where they were, and buses fought to get through gridlocked traffic, hampered by the lack of traffic signals. The subway did not reopen until August 18, the longest complete interruption in subway service in the history of the TTC. The incident led to an extensive review of TTC emergency procedures.
 On February 6, 2006, Mary Kim was born on a subway train at Wellesley station. TTC officials later promised Mary Kim lifetime access to the TTC's service.
 On April 23, 2007, a TTC asbestos removal crew employee, Tony Almeida, was killed and several others were injured at the end of a night shift when the work car they were operating snagged on some cabling and dislodged a work platform. The TTC was fined $250,000 ($ in  dollars) for violating the Occupational Health and Safety Act. It was later found that Almeida was under the influence of cannabis.

2010–2019
 On August 30, 2011, a woman was killed when a TTC bus rear-ended a flatbed truck carrying a crane on Lawrence Avenue between Victoria Park Avenue and Don Mills Road. At least 13 other people were injured in the crash. The bus driver was charged in the incident.
 On July 22, 2012, two people were injured when a bus crashed into a building on Queen Street West at Peter Street. The bus hit a car and then a taxicab before slamming into the building.
 On August 10, 2012, a man was chased through the Lawrence East station and gunned down against a fence. He survived with critical injuries and was identified as one of the emerging leaders of the Galloway Boys street gang.
On September 14, 2012, before the start of service TTC employee, Peter Pavlovski was killed and another TTC employee was seriously injured after being struck by a subway maintenance train north of Yorkdale station. The investigation prevented many trains from departing the Wilson Subway Yard, affecting morning rush service.
 On July 27, 2013, 18-year-old Sammy Yatim was shot dead by police aboard the 505 Dundas streetcar. The police officer who shot Yatim dead was later charged with second-degree murder and attempted murder and was found guilty of the latter.
 On August 13, 2013, a cube truck crashed head-on into an idle TTC bus near Middlefield Road and Steeles Avenue East. The accident killed one person and injured 12 people.
 Between December 21 and 22, 2013, a violent ice storm impacted TTC service. On December 22, all streetcar service was suspended for most of the day due to thick ice on the overhead wires. Between December 22 and 23, all of Line 3 Scarborough was shut down, and power issues led to Line 4 Sheppard being closed between December 22 and 24. A number of disruptions were also reported on Line 1 Yonge–University and Line 2 Bloor–Danforth, with some stations being closed for several hours due to power outages.
 On January 29, 2015, a brawl occurred at the concourse level of Union station just after a Toronto Maple Leafs game. Two intoxicated men were resisting arrest and fighting with transit special constables. During the arrest, two TTC Transit Enforcement Unit officers punched one man in the face several times and another man in the ribs during the arrest. Toronto Police arrived and charged the two men. A cell phone video was later posted on Facebook, causing public scrutiny and backlash against the TTC. An independent review of the incident later deemed the arrest and subsequent use of force to be lawful. Two years later, the victims filed a $4million lawsuit against the TTC and the two enforcement officers.
 On June 8, 2015, between 6:30a.m. and 8:00a.m., the entire subway network was shut down due to "major communication issues" between TTC subway trains and the TTC's transit control centre. Hundreds of thousands of commuters were stranded during the shutdown since no shuttle buses were provided to replace subway service. TTC officials believed the incident was caused by a defective switch that drained the battery for the backup power supply.
 On June 18, 2018, a man believed to be in his mid-50s to early 60s was pushed onto the eastbound Line 2 Bloor–Danforth tracks at Bloor–Yonge station and died when struck by an incoming subway train. A first-degree murder charge was laid against the man accused of the attack.

2020–2029
 On June 12, 2020, there was a near-collision between two subway trains on Line 1 Yonge–University. Prior to the incident, train 123 was standing on the pocket track on the south side of Osgoode station while train 114 was holding northbound at St. Andrew station with a medical emergency on board. Both trains started to head north towards the switch connecting the pocket track to the northbound main track at Osgoode station. The guard at the rear of train 123 spotted train 114 moving and alerted the operator who stopped train 123 within  of train 114. The mainline was under automatic train control (ATC) but Transit Control had instructed the crew of train 123 to use manual control on the pocket track. Train 123 was facing a red light on the pocket track, but it was not parked far enough in for its operator to properly see it. The TTC gave unpaid suspensions to the operators of train 123. The TTC union blamed a flaw in ATC that prevented its use on the pocket track. After the incident, the TTC disallowed manual mode on the pocket track.
 On October 29, 2021, the TTC became the target of a ransomware attack, which shut down Vision, the TTC's communications systems. After the attack, the TTC used its backup radio system to communicate with vehicle operators. Also affected were the TTC website (which had debuted its redesign to the public a few days prior), TTC internal email, Wheel-Trans online bookings and displays of next bus information. TTC staff detected unusual network activity on the evening of October 28, 2021, but the full effect of the attack peaked on the afternoon of October 29, 2021. By November 11, 2021, the TTC disclosed that the hackers may have had the ability to access personal employee information, such as social insurance numbers. As a result, the TTC offered three years of free credit monitoring and identity theft protection to its current and former employees. By this time, the TTC had restored its most important computer systems; however, its email system still remained offline.
 In December 2021, a vandal damaged elevators at 11 subway stations. Temporary repairs were completed within 24 hours, and TTC special constables apprehended a suspect, who was charged with ten counts of mischief.
 On January 17, 2022, a heavy snowfall of  crippled public transit in Toronto, including the TTC's subway, streetcar and bus systems. The TTC reported that 540 of its 1,300 vehicles in service were disabled on the street, including buses, which normally do not use snow tires. At-grade or above-grade sections of the subway system were not operational due to mechanical issues caused by heavy snow, with some sections closed until the end of service that day.

COVID-19 pandemic

Ridership decline and impact
By late March 2020, TTC ridership had dropped by 70 to 72 percent due to measures to combat the COVID-19 pandemic. Ridership had dropped 80 percent on the subway, 76 percent on streetcars, 62 percent on buses and 75 percent on Wheel-Trans. The TTC estimated its weekly fare revenue dropped from $25million to $7million. By late March, the TTC was operating 80 percent of its normal service with reduced ridership and lower staffing levels.

Because of the reduced ridership, the TTC cut a number of services starting March 23. All downtown express bus routes (141–145) and all but three of the 900-series express bus routes were suspended. Streetcar route 508 Lake Shore was suspended and route 503 Kingston Rd was shortened to run only along its namesake street.

By late April 2020, TTC ridership had fallen to 85 percent of pre-pandemic levels, and the TTC was losing $90million per month. On April 23, 2020, the TTC announced it would temporarily lay off 1000 operators (after the 30 days' notice required by their union contract) plus 200 non-unionized staff. The TTC still intended to operate between 70 and 80 percent of its pre-pandemic service.

In early May 2020, the TTC announced a further 15 percent reduction in service starting May 10. Rush-hour services on Line 1 Yonge–University and Line 2 Bloor–Danforth would be reduced to match midday and early evening frequency. Service would be cut on 120 bus and streetcar routes. All seasonal bus route extensions (such as to Toronto Zoo, Cherry Beach, Bluffer's Park, Ontario Place, Harbourfront and Woodbine Beach) would be deferred. The remainder of the 503 Kingston Rd route was replaced full-time by the 22A Coxwell bus. These service reductions were expected to last at least until the end of August 2020.

On May 24, 2020, due to reduced ridership and fare revenue, the TTC temporarily laid off 450 employees as a cost-saving measure.

In December 2020, the TTC decided to take advantage of low ridership due to the pandemic and temporarily closed a portion of Line 1 Yonge–University for nine full days in order to do maintenance. Maintenance included installing automatic train control, removing asbestos, repairing tunnel linings, track remediation and station cleaning. The closure will avoid over two years of early nightly closures and provide cost savings.

By February 2021, TTC operators had noticed that homeless people were taking refuge on TTC vehicles because other options were not available during the pandemic. Libraries and indoor seating at coffee shops were unavailable, and homeless shelters were 99.9 percent full. Since April 2020, two teamseach consisting of a TTC constable and an outreach workerhave attempted to help the homeless sheltering on TTC vehicles but with limited success due to the size of the TTC network. The TTC union urged the city to find alternative accommodation for the homeless.

In 2021, as in December 2020, the TTC again decided to take advantage of low ridership to shut down other portions of Line 1 Yonge–University for multiple 10-day periods for maintenance.

Protective changes

To maintain physical distancing from bus operators, boarding and fare payment procedures were changed on buses by late March. All passengers who did not require the wheelchair ramp had to board by the rear door of the bus. By April 8, 2020, the TTC was installing thick vinyl barriers on buses to separate the front of the bus from the passenger seating area; the barriers were collapsible to allow access for ramp users from the front door. The TTC stopped accepting cash, tokens and older tickets to pay fares on buses and bus operators stopped handing out paper transfers. However, the TTC allowed riders without a Presto card or Presto ticket to board buses, but asked that they pay the fare later if transferring to a streetcar or the subway. The TTC suspended fare inspections. The TTC permitted operators to wear masks on the job.

Despite the drop in ridership, there was still crowding on several bus routes, preventing physical distancing of the recommended  among riders. Crowding occurred when workers from manufacturing areas were boarding at a shift change. To address crowding, the TTC deployed extra buses on affected routes by April 1, 2020, and recommended that riders try to travel after 8a.m. Crowding was not observed to be a problem on subways and streetcars.

Washroom breaks became a problem for some bus and streetcar operators. While most surface routes connect with a subway station equipped with washrooms, some routes may take up to two hours to return to a subway station. Thus operators, who had informal agreements with private businesses to use their washrooms, found those facilities closed during the pandemic. Lack of washroom facilities became a health and safety issue as operators could be hurried and distracted. To remedy the problem, the TTC placed portable washrooms for employee use along some routes.

In January 2020, the TTC began performing extra cleaning and disinfection of vehicles and stations with a focus on touch-and-grab points. By mid-April 2020, the TTC was installing hand sanitizer dispensers at subway stations, aiming to complete installation at main entrances by April and secondary entrances by May. Dispensers are located just inside the paid area, and staff monitor them for customer usability. In late April, the TTC blocked off seats on buses, streetcars and subway trains to promote physical distancing among passengers; the TTC used caution tape initially to block seats until more formal seat coverings and signage became available. Starting May 4, bus operators were allowed to designate their bus as "drop off only" and display those words on the LED sign on the front of the bus. "Drop off only" meant that no additional passengers would be allowed to board. This change was to maintain physical distancing and prevent overloading the bus.

The TTC closed its Customer Service Centre above Davisville station on March 17, 2020, and its Lost Articles Office in Bay station and Photo ID Facility in Bathurst station effective March 19. In late March, the TTC allowed Presto card holders on the 12-month pass plan to cancel the plan without penalty. The cancellation was effective from April onwards and lasted until card holders set up a new auto-renew subscription.

The TTC has assigned Wheel-Trans vehicles for the transfer of Toronto Community Housing residents with COVID-19 symptoms to healthcare facilities. The TTC operators for such trips are equipped with personal protective equipment, and the vehicles are given an intense cleaning after use. All Wheel-Trans vehicles are restricted to carrying only one passenger at a time during the pandemic.

In late April 2020, the TTC, working with Toronto Paramedic Services, converted five decommissioned TTC buses into ambulances to transport COVID-19 patients. Each bus can carry 3 stretcher patients, 8–10 ambulatory patients, 3 paramedics to attend to patients, and a TTC driver. These buses may be used to transfer patients between health facilities, to handle large incidents, and to provide shelter for facility evacuations. They have also been used to shuttle homeless people from shelters and campsites to medical and cooling facilities.

Initially, the TTC supplied masks only to Wheel-Trans operators and maintenance workers dealing with hazardous substances. By mid-April 2020, the TTC changed its policy after pressure from its union, Amalgamated Transit Union Local 113. Subsequently, each bus operator received two masks along with gloves, hand sanitizer, and disinfectant wipes. The TTC later provided the same equipment to streetcar operators.

Effective July 2, 2020, passengers were required, with few exceptions, to wear masks when riding on the TTC. Despite a potential fine of $195, the TTC stated that it would not be enforcing this requirement. Instead, the TTC decided to use 100 "COVID-19 ambassadors" to encourage passengers to wear a mask. The goal was to have 90 percent of passengers wearing masks, and by July 10, 2020, the TTC observed that 89 percent of all riders were wearing masks despite the lack of enforcement. Prior to the mask policy, only half of riders were wearing masks. By August, 95 percent of riders were wearing masks according to the TTC CEO's Report for that month. By September, compliance was at 97 percent.

By August 2020, the TTC had purchased 600 foot-activated hand sanitizer dispensers from Canadian Mill Nettclean Supply Inc. and distributed them throughout the system.

Effective September 17, 2020, and lasting until at least December 31 of the same year, the TTC ordered that all TTC employees that could come into contact with other individuals wear masks. Previously, masks were optional for TTC employees. Exceptions include subway and streetcar operators who work alone in closed cabs. The TTC had observed in August 2020 that employees were gathering in groups on TTC property without masks and physical distancing.

By mid-November 2020, the TTC was having 11 vending machines installed at 10 subway stations where customers could purchase personal protective equipment (PPE) such as masks, gloves, sanitizer and wipes. This was addition to TTC staff handing out free single-use masks at some subway stations.

Reinstatement of services
On May 19, 2020, the Lost Articles Office reopened, with only one person at a time being allowed in its vestibule. The office had been closed since March 20, 2020, because of the city lockdown to prevent the spread of COVID-19. Similarly, the TTC reopened its Customer Service Centre on May 25, 2020, allowing only two customers at a time in the office. On June 22, the TTC restored full service on route 503 Kingston Rd that had been partly suspended on March 24 due to reduced ridership.

By late June 2020, although subway and streetcar ridership remained at 18 percent of pre-pandemic levels, bus ridership had reached 37 percent, compared to 14 percent in late April. By this time physical distancing was becoming difficult with 18 percent of bus trips exceeding the maximum of 15 passengers per bus.

In June 2020, the TTC resumed fare inspections but only to advise and encourage passengers to pay their fares. On July 2, 2020, all-door boarding was implemented on buses. Passengers could pay cash, tokens and senior and youth tickets and obtain a transfer at the front door of a bus; this reversed a change made in early April.

On August 12, 2020, the Province of Ontario promised $404million for TTC operations to compensate for reduced ridership and revenue loss during the pandemic, with more funding to come later. The TTC projected a shortfall of $700million in 2020. At the time, ridership was at 35 percent of pre-pandemic levels; it was increasing more on buses than on other modes. When ridership increases to 50 percent, the TTC will start restoring more services, which have been operating at 85 percent of pre-pandemic levels. As a condition of funding, the provincial government is requiring transit agencies, including the TTC, to consider using privately operated microtransit such as Uber's ride-sharing services to replace low-volume bus routes. Innisfil in Simcoe County north of Toronto conducted a pilot of such an approach, which was popular with participants but was criticized for costing more than a public transit bus service and contributing to congestion.

On August 27, 2020, the TTC announced a recall of 150 of the 450 TTC employees who were laid off in late May. This was to handle school reopenings in September. By late August, ridership had increased from its lowest point of 15–20 percent to 35–40 per cent of pre-pandemic ridership. On September 17, the TTC announced the recall of an additional 132 laid-off union employees to return to work starting October 4. The TTC will recall the remaining 168 laid-off employees when ridership reaches 50 percent of pre-pandemic levels.

On October 15, 2020, the TTC announced the recall of the last 180 laid-off front-line workers, including 97 operators. The recall would allow the TTC to restore full service to the system. At that time, ridership had risen to 36 percent of pre-pandemic levels; by mode, bus ridership was at about 50 percent of pre-pandemic levels versus 32 and 36 percent for subway and streetcar usage respectively. The TTC was responding to complaints of overcrowding (given the requirements for physical distancing) on buses even though the bus system was already at 95 percent capacity. The recall would also allow the TTC to staff shuttle buses during a scheduled ten-day shutdown of Line 1 Yonge–University in December 2020 between Finch and Sheppard–Yonge stations for asbestos removal. The TTC planned to recruit new drivers to replace those retiring.

As part of a project dubbed RapidTO, the TTC opened priority bus lanes on Eglinton Avenue East on October 11, 2020. The COVID-19 pandemic provided the impetus for the RapidTO project. The lanes were created to improve TTC service in lower-income neighbourhoods, which house employees performing essential services during the pandemic. By allowing buses to move faster, there would be less crowding and better physical distancing. Two express bus routes (905 Eglinton East Express and 986 Scarborough Express) that were suspended in mid-March 2020 were restored to operate along the new bus lanes. Effective November 23, 2020, eight additional 900-series express bus routes were restored elsewhere in the city for Monday-to-Friday service.

For the week ending October 1, 2021, the TTC was operating 98 percent of its service, carrying 43 percent of its pre-pandemic ridership. By November 2021, the TTC began to enforce a vaccine mandate affecting its employees. Any employee not reporting their vaccine status by November 20, 2021, would be placed on unpaid leave. Any employee not vaccinated by December 31, 2021, would be terminated. As of November 16, 2021, 90 percent of TTC employees had disclosed their vaccine status, of which 85 percent were fully vaccinated. The TTC expected this would result in a labour shortage. Thus, for the service period beginning November 21, 2021, the TTC planned to temporarily reduce service on Line 2 Bloor–Danforth and on 57 bus routes and one streetcar line (512 St. Clair). The TTC estimated a 10 percent reduction in service starting November 21, 2021. By early December 2021, 800 TTC employees had been suspended without pay for failing to comply with the vaccine mandate. On December 31, 2021, the TTC dismissed 354 employees (over two percent of its workforce) for non-compliance with the vaccine mandate. About 200 other employees were still on unpaid leave pending the receipt of a second vaccine dose by January 31, 2022. The TTC embarked on a recruitment campaign to replace the dismissed employees. On February 13, 2022, the TTC partially restored service to pre-pandemic levels on 17 bus routes.

In August 2022, TTC ridership was 55–60 percent of pre-pandemic volumes. Due to the lifting of COVID-19 restrictions, the TTC expected a 10–15 percent increase in passenger volume as workers return to offices and students return to school. Thus, the TTC scheduled increased service starting on September 4, 2022, affecting 29 bus routes, 2 streetcar routes, and subway lines 1 and 2. At that date, all but six of the routes suspended in March 2020 were back in service. The five Downtown Express routes 141–145 remained suspended pending a review of their effectiveness for the 2023 Annual Service Plan. The 508 Lake Shore streetcar route remained suspended pending completion of a track replacement along its route.

By October 7, 2022, ridership on the bus system was 75 percent of pre-pandemic levels, with 54 percent for the streetcar system, 62 percent for the subway system and 62 percent for Wheel-Trans.

In November 2022, the TTC offered to rehire many of the 367 unvaccinated workers it dismissed in late 2021. The TTC lifted its mandatory vaccination policy effective the end of that month. Rehired workers would not get back pay but their seniority would be preserved.

COVID-19 incidents

On March 19, 2020, the TTC temporarily closed the Duncan garage at the Hillcrest Complex after a mechanic tested as positive for COVID-19. The TTC sent 170 co-workers home to self-isolate for two weeks and had the garage disinfected. The mechanic testing positive had worked one shift on March 11 before being sent home after feeling ill. Since the garage was used for major overhauls and rebuilds, its temporary closure had no impact on daily bus operations.

On April 23, 2020, the TTC sent 70 staff at the Queensway garage home to self-isolate for two weeks after five co-workers tested positive for COVID-19. The TTC had the garage disinfected. The garage was not closed; some managerial staff were assigned maintenance work, and the TTC intended to reassign some maintenance work to other garages.

By June 2020, there had not been any confirmed cases of COVID-19 being spread by passengers riding on public transit. This observation contradicted predictions at the beginning of the crisis that public transit would be a major venue for the spread of virus. 65 out of 15,000 TTC employees contracted COVID-19, but it is unknown whether they contracted it on or off the job. Toronto Public Health (TPH) did not trace any of the 13,500 COVID-19 cases to public transit. TPH spokesperson Dr. Vinita Dubey warned that this did not mean the virus was being transmitted on public transit as the long 14-day incubation period makes it difficult to determine where and when infection occurred.

Suicides

The TTC has long maintained a policy of not releasing suicide information and statistics to the public or the media for fear of the possibility of "copycat suicides". In 2008, the Toronto Sun launched a year-long appeal before Ontario's Information and Privacy Commissioner to have the TTC release information on the number of suicides and attempts between 1998 and 2007. The Information and Privacy Commissioner ordered the statistics be made available, and they were released to the public on November 26, 2009.

From 1998 to 2007, 150 people died by suicide by coming into contact with a TTC subway train. Since 1954, when the Yonge subway line first opened, there have been more than 1,200 incidents on the TTC (including both fatalities and attempts).

After being forced to make the information public, the TTC ensured that it also released information demonstrating the efforts being taken to intervene and prevent such incidents in the future. The TTC's "Gatekeeper Program" is an internal course available for front line staff to learn and identify the warning signs of someone who may be suicidal, and help them or try to prevent them from doing so on the transit system. The TTC also has partnerships with St. Michael's Hospital and other institutions to assist with both prevention programs and counselling programs for staff who have witnessed such incidents. The TTC maintains that it will continue its policy of not reporting suicides and suicide-related statistics, however in February 2010, statistics from 2008 and 2009 were released in a public report to the Commission regarding suicide and suicide prevention. On November 10, 2014, separate suicide attempts were made, halting service on two lines. Following this, platform screen doors were discussed, but the TTC does not yet have a plan for funding the $800 million required to upgrade all 75 subway stations, which also includes the December 2017 extension of the University segment of Line 1 to Vaughan Metropolitan Centre station.

Statistics
The below statistics are the subway suicide incidents and attempts from 1998 through 2016:

Note: Data obtained from Toronto Transit Commission report that does not distinguish between attempted and completed suicides.

Track delays
In 2018, the TTC reported that trains were delayed for 1572 total minutes and that there were over 110 unauthorized track-level incidents.

Motorists entering streetcar tunnels

There have been over twenty incidents of motorists illegally entering the streetcar portal west of Queens Quay station between 2014 and 2017. The figure increased to 25 from 2014 to March 2018. Because of these incidents, the TTC installed boom barriers to deter motorists from entering the portal in October 2018; the barriers cost $61,000 to install.

References

External links
 , TTC video of a near-collision on June 12, 2020

Incidents